Hamid Hassy was an anti-Gaddafi fighter, a Colonel in the National Liberation Army (NLA) and a field commander in the Libyan Civil War. He took part in the Battle of Brega-Ajdabiya, Fourth Battle of Brega, and Battle of Sirte (2011).

References 

Libyan colonels
Living people
People of the First Libyan Civil War
National Liberation Army (Libya)
Year of birth missing (living people)